Castle of Khosrow abad is an ancient castle built in Qajar era. This castle located in Khosrow abad village, Abarkuh County, Yazd Province.

Castle of Khosrow abad has been registered in List of National monuments of Iran by the ID 25360.

See also
Castle of Tawseelah

References

Archaeological sites in Iran
Castles in Iran
Monuments and memorials in Iran
Buildings and structures in Yazd Province
Qajar castles
National works of Iran